Statewatch is a non-profit organization founded in 1991 that monitors civil liberties and other issues in the European Union and encourages investigative reporting and research.

The organization has three free databases: a large database of all its news, articles and links since 1991, the Statewatch European Monitoring and Documentation Centre (SEMDOC) which monitors all new justice and home affairs measures since 1993.

The predecessor to Statewatch was "State Research" (1977-1982), which produced a bi-monthly bulletin and carried research.

Among other activities, it monitors anti-terrorist legislation, has a Passenger Name Record observatory, is concerned about asylum issues, data privacy, biometrics, etc.

The organization and its director, Tony Bunyan, have received awards for their civil rights activism including a 1998 award from the British Campaign for Freedom of Information and the 2011 "Long Walk" award at the Liberty's Human Rights Awards.

References

External links

Information privacy
International organisations based in London
Non-profit organisations based in London
Organisations based in the City of London
Organizations established in 1991
Organizations related to the European Union
Watchdog journalism
1991 establishments in Europe